Schizogyniidae is a family of mites in the order Mesostigmata.

Species
Schizogyniidae contains six genera, with six recognized species:

 Genus Fusura Valle & Fox, 1966
 Fusura civica Valle & Fox, 1966
 Genus Choriarchus Kinn, 1966
 Choriarchus reginus Kinn, 1966
 Genus Indogynium Sellnick, 1954
 Indogynium lindbergi Sellnick, 1954
 Genus Mixogynium Ryke, 1957
 Mixogynium proteae Ryke, 1957
 Genus Paraschizogynium P. E. Hunter & R. M. T. Rosario, 1987
 Paraschizogynium odontokeri P. E. Hunter & R. M. T. Rosario, 1987
 Genus Schizogynium Karg 1997
 Schizogynium forcipis Karg, 1997

References

Mesostigmata
Acari families